Fureidis (also Freidis;) is an  Arab town in the Haifa District of Israel. It received local council status in 1952.

Name
The name is believed to come from the Arabic (firdawis), meaning little Garden of Eden, borrowed from the Persian word for paradise.

History
A cave above the old part of Fureidis on the western slope of the Carmel was found to contain fragments of pottery from the Chalcolithic period, including large bowls, jars, ossuary fragments and a pale pink limestone pendant. It appears to have been used as a dwelling and a burial cave. The artifacts in the cave attest to the presence of a settlement from the pre-Ghassulian period.

Pottery and remains from an aqueduct dating to the Roman and Byzantine periods have also been found.

In the 19th century, three rock-hewn tombs were examined at Fureidis, each with several kokhim.

At the northern edge of Fureidis, pottery remains from the 13th -14th century, a coin dating to 1388–1399 CE, and building remains dated to the Mamluk period have been excavated.

Ottoman era
During the late Ottoman period, in 1859, the English consul Rogers estimated the population to be 200, who cultivated 18 feddans of land.

In 1870, the French explorer Victor Guérin visited the village. He estimated it had one hundred and forty people, mostly shepherds and woodcutters, some who also cultivated the land.

In 1882, the PEF's Survey of Western Palestine (SWP) described the place as a village of adobe and stone at the foot of the hill, with a well to the south.

A population list from about 1887 showed that Kh. Fureidis had about 300 inhabitants, all Muslim.

British Mandate era
In the 1922 census of Palestine conducted by the British Mandate authorities, Al Feridis had a population of 335; all Muslims, increasing in the 1931 census to 454; still all Muslims, in a total of 98 houses.

In the 1945 statistics the population of Fureidis consisted of 780 Muslims and the land area was 4,450 dunams, according to an official land and population survey. Of this, 365 dunams were designated for plantations and irrigable land, 1,717 for cereals, while 6 dunams were built-up (urban) areas.

1948 war and after
Fureidis is one of the few Arab villages on Israel's coast left intact after the 1948 war. During the conflict, it received a great number of refugees from nearby villages, including Tantura, and was repeatedly considered for assault by Israeli forces. However, residents of local Jewish settlements, in particular Zichron Yaakov requested that Fureidis (and the neighbouring village of Jisr az-Zarqa) be allowed to remain, as they had traditionally had good relations with the Yishuv, and a large number of residents from Fureidis worked as hired labour on Jewish farms. This was alluded to by Arab novelist Emile Habibi in his famous novel The Secret Life of Saeed the Pessoptimist.

As of the census of 2008, Fureidis had 10,800 residents, of whom 99.6% were Muslim Arabs.

According to data released by the Israeli Ministry of Education based on a 2008 census of high school matriculation scores, Fureidis had a 75.85% eligibility rate, greatly exceeding the accomplishments of most Jewish towns. The national eligibility rate in 2008-2009 was 44.4 percent of all 17-year-olds. Fureidis won third place in the national ranking. Hossni Abu Dahash, the town's high school principal, said the school had organized a marathon study program to prepare 12th graders for their matriculation exam.

Ibtisam Mahmid, whose family came from Tantura, became an activist after 1995 when she was thrown out of an Egged bus because she was an Arab.

Ibtisam Mahammed of Fureidis was awarded the Dalai Lama's Unsung Heroes of Compassion prize for her efforts to promote peace between Arabs and Jews. For many years Mahammed has been organizing Jewish and Arab women's circles to promote dialogue. She heads several women's peace organizations and has fought on behalf of battered women in Arab society.

Notable people

 Mohamed Abu Arisha (born 1997), Israeli basketball player for Hapoel Be'er Sheva of the Israeli Basketball Premier League and the Israeli national basketball team

See also
 Arab localities in Israel

References

Bibliography

External links
Welcome To Fureidis
Survey of Western Palestine, Map 8:     IAA, Wikimedia commons
Fureidis, Paradise Lost, a documentary by Ebtisam Mara’ana

Arab localities in Israel
Local councils in Haifa District